Svetozar Gligorić (Serbian Cyrillic: Светозар Глигорић, 2 February 1923 – 14 August 2012) was a Serbian and Yugoslav chess grandmaster and musician. He won the championship of Yugoslavia a record twelve times, and is considered the best player ever from Serbia. In 1958, he was declared the best athlete of Yugoslavia.

In the 1950s and 1960s, Gligorić was one of the top players in the world. He was also among the world's most popular players, owing to his globe-trotting tournament schedule and a particularly engaging personality, reflected in the title of his autobiography, I Play Against Pieces (i.e., without hostility toward the opponent, and not differently against different players for "psychological" reasons; playing "the board and not the man").

Life 
Gligorić was born in Belgrade to a poor family. According to his recollections, his first exposure to chess was as a small child watching patrons play in a neighborhood bar. He began to play at the age of eleven, when taught by a boarder taken in by his mother (his father had died by this time). Lacking a chess set, he made one for himself by carving pieces from corks from wine bottles—a story paralleling the formative years of his contemporary, the renowned Estonian grandmaster Paul Keres.

Gligorić was a good student during his youth, with both academic and athletic successes that famously led to him to be invited to represent his school at a birthday celebration for Prince Peter, who later became King Peter II of Yugoslavia. He later recounted to International Master David Levy (who chronicled his chess career in The Chess of Gligoric) his distress at attending this gala event wearing poor clothing stemming from his family's impoverished condition. His first tournament success came in 1938 when he won the Belgrade Chess Club championship; however, World War II interrupted his chess progress for a time. During the war, Gligorić was a member of a partisan unit. A chance encounter with a chess-playing partisan officer led to his removal from combat.

Following World War II, Gligorić worked for several years as a journalist and organizer of chess tournaments. He continued to progress as a player and was awarded the International Master (IM) title in 1950 and the Grandmaster (GM) title in 1951, eventually making the transition to full-time chess professional. He continued active tournament play well into his sixties.

Chess career 

Gligorić was one of the most successful tournament players of the mid-20th century, with a number of tournament victories to his credit, but was less successful in competing for the World Chess Championship. He was Yugoslav champion in 1947 (joint), 1948 (joint), 1949, 1950, 1956, 1957, 1958 (joint), 1959, 1960, 1962, 1965 and 1971.

He represented his native Yugoslavia with great success in fifteen Chess Olympiads from 1950 to 1982 (thirteen times on ), playing 223 games (+88−26=109). In the first post-war Olympiad, on home soil at Dubrovnik 1950, Gligoric played on first board and led Yugoslavia to a historic result, the team gold medal. The Yugoslav team was usually second or third in the world during the 1950s.

His list of first-place finishes in international chess competitions is one of the longest and includes such events as Mar del Plata 1950, Stockholm 1954, Belgrade 1964, Manila 1968, Lone Pine 1972 and 1979, etc.  He was a regular competitor in the series of great tournaments held at Hastings, with wins (or ties for first) in 1951–52, 1956–57, 1959–60, 1960–61 and 1962–63. His five wins and shared wins at Hastings remains a record for the event.

His record in world championship qualifying events was mixed. He was a regular competitor in Zonal and Interzonal competitions with several successes, e.g. zonal wins in 1951, 1960 (joint), 1963, 1966, and 1969 (joint) and finishes at the Interzonals of 1952, 1958 and 1967 high enough to qualify him for the final Candidates events the following years. However, he was not as successful in any of the Candidates events, with mediocre results in the 1953 and 1959 Candidates Tournaments and a match loss to Mikhail Tal in the 1968 Candidates match series.

Lifetime scores against world champions 
Gligorić had the following record against the world champions he played against: Max Euwe +2−0=5, Mikhail Botvinnik +2−2=6, Vasily Smyslov +6−8=28, Tigran Petrosian +8−11=19, Mikhail Tal +2−10=22, Boris Spassky +0−6=16, Bobby Fischer +4−6=8, Anatoly Karpov +0−4=6 and Garry Kasparov +0−3=0.

Death 
On August 14, 2012, Svetozar Gligorić died from a stroke at 89 years of age in Belgrade. Gligorić was buried on August 16, 2012, at 13:30 in the Alley of the Greats at Belgrade's New Cemetery.

Legacy 
Although he compiled a superb tournament record, it is perhaps as an openings theorist and commentator that Gligorić will be best remembered. He made enormous contributions to the theory and practice of the King's Indian Defence, Ruy Lopez and Nimzo-Indian Defence, among others; and, particularly with the King's Indian, translated his theoretical contributions into several spectacular victories with both colours (including the notable game below). Theoretically significant variations in the King's Indian and Ruy Lopez are named for him. His battles with Bobby Fischer in the King's Indian and Sicilian Defence (particularly the Najdorf Variation, a long-time Fischer specialty) often worked out in his favour.

As a commentator, Gligorić was able to take advantage of his fluency in a number of languages and his training as a journalist, to produce lucid, interesting game annotations. He was a regular columnist for Chess Review and Chess Life magazines for many years, his "Game of the Month" column often amounting to a complete tutorial in the opening used in the feature game as well as a set of comprehensive game annotations. He wrote a number of chess books in several languages. One of the most notable was Fischer vs. Spassky: The Chess Match of the Century, a detailed account of their epic struggle for the world title in Reykjavík in 1972. He also contributed regularly to the Chess Informant semi-annual (more recently, thrice-yearly) compilation of the world's most important chess games.

In 2019, FIDE established a fair play award named after Gligorić. The Fair Play Svetozar Gligoric Trophy is awarded annually by a three member commission in recognition of sportsmanship, integrity and the promotion ethical behavior within chess.

Notable games 

One of Gligorić's most famous games was this win against the former world champion Tigran Petrosian at the great "Tournament of Peace" held in Zagreb in 1970. It displays Gligorić's virtuosity on the Black side of the King's Indian and his willingness to play for a sacrificial attack against one of history's greatest defenders. Zagreb 1970 was another Gligorić tournament success, as he tied for second (with Petrosian and others) behind Fischer, at the start of the latter's 1970–71 run of tournament and match victories.

Petrosian vs. Gligorić, Zagreb 1970; King's Indian Defence, Classical Variation (ECO E97) 1.c4 g6 2.Nf3 Bg7 3.d4 Nf6 4.Nc3 0-0 5.e4 d6 6.Be2 e5 7.0-0 Nc6 8.d5 Ne7 9.b4 Nh5 10.Nd2 Nf4 11.a4 f5 12.Bf3 g5 13.exf5 Nxf5 14.g3 (diagram) Nd4 15.gxf4 Nxf3+ 16.Qxf3 g4 17.Qh1 exf4 18.Bb2 Bf5 19.Rfe1 f3 20.Nde4 Qh4 21.h3 Be5 22.Re3 gxh3 23.Qxf3 Bg4 24.Qh1 h2+ 25.Kg2 Qh5 26.Nd2 Bd4 27.Qe1 Rae8 28.Nce4 Bxb2 29.Rg3 Be5 30.R1a3 Kh8 31.Kh1 Rg8 32.Qf1 Bxg3 33.Rxg3 Rxe4 

Indeed, Gligorić was the first person to inflict a defeat on Petrosian after he won the world title from Mikhail Botvinnik in 1963.

Bibliography 
 Selected Chess Masterpieces, Pitman, 1970. 
 To all the FIDE Members and Central Committee, Belgrade 1978
 Šahovski vodič. T. 1, Suština šaha, Belgrade 1988, 
 Igram protiv figura, Belgrade 1989, 
 Peti meč Kasparov–Karpov za titulu svetskog prvaka, Belgrade 1991, 
 Gligina varijanta, Belgrade 2000
 Fischer vs. Spassky – The Chess Match of the Century, Simon and Schuster, 1972, 
 I Play Against Pieces, Batsford, 288 pages, 2002.
 The Chess of Gligoric by David N. L. Levy, World Publishing, 192 pages, 1972.

See also 
Borislav Kostić
Dragoljub Velimirović

References

External links 

 
 Chessbase article : To Gligoric with Love – a legend turns 85
  “Svetozar Gligorić (1923-2012)” by Edward Winter

1923 births
2012 deaths
Yugoslav Partisans members
Chess grandmasters
Chess Olympiad competitors
Serbian chess players
Sportspeople from Belgrade
Yugoslav chess players
Serbian chess writers
Chess arbiters
Chess theoreticians
Burials at Belgrade New Cemetery